The University of Tours, formerly François Rabelais University of Tours, is a public university in Tours, France. Founded in 1969, the university was formerly named after the French writer François Rabelais. It is the largest university in the Centre-Val de Loire region. As of July 2015, it is a member of the regional university association Leonardo da Vinci consolidated University.

History
The University of Tours was established as part of efforts to modernize and democratize higher education in France after the events of 1968. The university was created by grouping together a number of older educational institutions.

Organisation
The university has a number of campuses, often dedicated to a specific faculty, distributed across the city of Tours:
 Plat d’Étain (administration and offices)
 Tanneurs (languages and literature, arts and humanities) 
 Tonnellé (medicine)
 Portalis/Deux-Lions (engineering, law, economics, geography)
 Grandmont (sciences, pharmaceutical studies) 
 Pont-Volant (contains a University Institute of Technology)
 Fromont
 Émile Zola

The university also has a satellite campus in Blois.

Academics

The university comprises seven departments, as well as an engineering school and two technology institutes: 
 Department of Arts and Humanities 
 Center for Advanced Renaissance Studies (Centre d'Etudes Supérieures de la Renaissance)
 Department of Law, Economics and Social Sciences
 Department of Literature and Languages 
 Department of Medicine
 Department of Sciences and Technology
 Department of Pharmacy 
 School of Engineering (École polytechnique de l'université de Tours)
 Tours University Institute of Technology (Institut Universitaire de Technologie de Tours)
 Blois University Institute of Technology (Institut Universitaire de Technologie de Blois)

The university offers bachelor, master and doctorate degrees in line with the Bologna Process. It also provides Technological Diploma courses (diplômes universitaire de technologie) through the two University Institutes of Technology. Several other institutions operate within the framework of the university:
 École publique de journalisme de Tours, a semi-autonomous journalism school affiliated to the university.
 Centre hospitalier régional et universitaire de Tours (CHU de Tours), a grouping of six regional hospitals affiliated to the university that collaborate on health services and medical training.
 Institut européen d'histoire et des cultures de l'alimentation, a humanities and social sciences research center that studies the history of food cultures.

Research
Research at the university is at the forefront in the social sciences and humanities in the study of the Renaissance through the Graduate Center of the Renaissance since 1956 and in knowledge of food heritage through a program ambitious research at the Institute of European history and culture of food.

The University of Tours is also distinguished in the field of materials for energy technology research with the Microelectronic at CERTEM in collaboration with ST Microelectronics in 1996.

The research also extends into the field of medical imaging and bio-medicine, oncology, and eminently in the study of autism at the University Hospital of Tours. Geo-science and environment with the study of insects at the Institute for Research on the biology of the insect (IRBI). Since 1969 the CESA, Planning Department today Polytech'Tours research in the field of cities, territories and societies is deemed to France. Finally the University of Tours works in the field of mathematical research through the Laboratory of Theoretical Physics and Mathematics.

Rankings
In 2022, the Academic Ranking of World Universities placed François Rabelais University in the 901-1000 band of universities in the world and in the 28-30 band of universities in France.

François Rabelais University undergraduate law program is ranked 3rd in France by Eduniversal, with 3 stars (2016/17).

Notable people
Faculty
 Raymond Chevallier (1929-2004) - historian, archaeologist and Latinist
 Michel Arrivé (1936-2017) - novelist, short story writer, linguist
 Maurice Sartre (born 1944) - historian
 Jean Germain (1947-2015) - university president; socialist politician
 Jean-Paul Goux (born 1948) - writer
 Gregory Grefenstette (born 1956) - French and American researcher and professor in computer science
 Christian Delporte (born 1958 in Paris) - specialist in political and cultural history of France in the twentieth century
 Éric de Chassey (born 1965, Pittsburgh, Pennsylvania, U.S.) - historian of French art, art critic 
 Kilien Stengel (born 1972) - gastronomic author, restaurateur, and cookbook writer
 Claire Sotinel - historian; expert on Italy in late antiquity, religion, society, and prosopography

Alumni
 Moshe Prywes (1914-1998) - Israeli physician and first president of Ben-Gurion University of the Negev.
 Bruno Schroder (1933-2019) - British banker and billionaire
 Sadreddin Elahi (1934-2021) - Iranian journalist and author
 Peter Stasiuk (born 16 July 1943 in Roblin, Manitoba, Canada) - Australian Ukrainian Greek Catholic hierarch  
 Bruno Latour (1947-2022) - philosopher
 Marie-Laure Augry (born 1947, in Tours) - France 3 journalist. 
 Jean-Pierre Ouvrard (1948-1992) - musicologist, music educator and choral conductor
 Adolé Isabelle Glitho-Akueson (born 1949, in Benin) - Professor of Animal Biology at the University of Lome.
 Souleymane Mboup (born 1951) - Senegalese microbiologist, medical researcher, and colonel in the Armed Forces of Senegal 
 Chioma Opara (born 1951 in Jos, Nigeria) - author and academic whose work primarily focuses on West African feminism
 Jean-Daniel Flaysakier ((1951-2021) - physician and journalist
 Patrick Pietropoli (born 1953) - painter and sculptor
 Amadou Koné (born 1953, in what is now Burkina Faso) - taught literature, culture and African history at Georgetown University
 Géraldine Legendre (born 1953) - French-American cognitive scientist and linguist
 Regina Yaou (1955-2017) - writer from Côte d'Ivoire
 Catherine Colonna (born 1956) - diplomat and politician 
 Mark Ormerod (civil servant) (born 1957) - British civil servant and chief executive of the Supreme Court of the United Kingdom from 2015 to 2020
 Sabine Thillaye (born 1959) - French-German entrepreneur and politician (LREM)
 Philippe Briand (born 1960, in Tours) - member of the National Assembly(LR)
 Laurent Percerou (born 1961) - bishop of the Catholic Church 
 Renaud Machart (born 1962) - journalist, music critic, radio producer and music producer
 Joël Bruneau (born 1963) - politician (LR)
 Éric Brunet (born 1964) - author, political commentator and radio host 
 Fabrice Lhomme (born 1965) - investigative journalist for Le Monde
 Alexandra Goujon (born 1972) - political scientist
 Harry Roselmack (born 1973, in Tours) - TF1 journalist.
 Stéphanie Rist (born 1973) - rheumatologist and politician (LREM)
 Maboula Soumahoro (born 1976 in Paris) - scholar and Afro-feminist 
 Jean-Pascal Chaigne (born 1977) - composer
 Géraldine Chauvet - operatic mezzo-soprano
 Charlotte Opimbat - Congolese politician
 Ludovic Ferrière (born 1982 in Blois, France) - geologist and curator of meteorite collection at the Natural History Museum, Vienna, Austria

Honorary degree recipients
 Martín Berasategui (born 1960) - Spanish chef expert in Basque cuisine

See also
 List of public universities in France by academy

References

External links
 Official website
 Les Cahiers d’EMAM: Études sur le Monde Arabe et la Méditerranée , academic journal published by Équipe Monde arabe Méditerranée, CITERES, Université de Tours 

 
Educational institutions established in 1969
Public universities in France
Universities and colleges in Tours, France
1969 establishments in France
Law schools in France
François Rabelais